T. Theodre Reginald is an Indian politician and a former Member of the Legislative Assembly from Maruthoorkurichi, Kanyakumari District. He was elected to the Tamil Nadu legislative assembly as a Dravida Munnetra Kazhagam candidate from Padmanabhapuram constituency in Kanyakumari district in 2006 election. He also became the first DMK MLA to represent padmanabhapuram constituency.

References 

Dravida Munnetra Kazhagam politicians
Living people
Year of birth missing (living people)